William Rodon Rennalls (19 October 1789 – 14 February 1863) was a lawyer in Jamaica and barrister of the Middle Temple in London. He was elected to the House of Assembly of Jamaica in 1820 for the Parish of Saint Catherine.

References 

Members of the House of Assembly of Jamaica
1789 births
1864 deaths
Burials at Kensal Green Cemetery